Gerd Heidemann (born 4 December 1931) is a German journalist best known for his role in the publication of purported Hitler Diaries that were subsequently proved to be forgeries.

In the 1970s, Heidemann bought the yacht Carin II, which had belonged to Hermann Göring, met his daughter Edda Göring and had an affair with her which lasted for five years. They entertained on the yacht and their guests included two Second World War generals, Karl Wolff and Wilhelm Mohnke.

Heidemann came forward with his story of lost diaries written by Adolf Hitler in 1983. He sold the rights to the West German magazine Stern for DM 10,000,000 (then approximately US$6 million), along with his tale about how they had been hidden in a barn in East Germany for many years. Several experts, including the British historian Hugh Trevor-Roper, came forward to pronounce the diaries to be authentic. The "diaries" were exposed as fabrications and Heidemann was arrested, tried and sentenced in 1985 to four and a half years in prison for fraud. Konrad Kujau, who had forged the diary, as he had done previously with other fraudulent Hitler documents, was also imprisoned. Heidemann had also stolen some of the money from Kujau; he was renting expensive residences, buying new cars and jewellery and buying more Nazi memorabilia, of which a great amount were more of Kujau's forgeries.

In 2002, it was alleged that Heidemann had worked as a double-agent for the Stasi, and that the publication of the Hitler diaries had been part of a Soviet and East German plan to embarrass and discredit the Capitalist West. In the BBC Radio 4 programme The Reunion broadcast on 7 September 2008, Heidemann vehemently denied that he had ever been a spy for the Stasi. 

By 2008, Heidemann was living in poverty.

References

1931 births
Living people
German journalists
German male journalists
20th-century German journalists
21st-century German journalists
German male writers
German prisoners and detainees
Prisoners and detainees of Germany
German fraudsters